Heather McDermid (born 17 October 1968 in Calgary) is a Canadian rower.

References 
 
 

1968 births
Living people
Canadian female rowers
Sportspeople from Calgary
Rowers at the 1996 Summer Olympics
Rowers at the 2000 Summer Olympics
Olympic silver medalists for Canada
Olympic bronze medalists for Canada
Olympic rowers of Canada
Olympic medalists in rowing
Medalists at the 2000 Summer Olympics
Medalists at the 1996 Summer Olympics
World Rowing Championships medalists for Canada
20th-century Canadian women